Bolhó is a village in Somogy county, Hungary.

Notable residents
 Pál Losonczi (1919 - 2005), Hungarian politician, President of the Presidential Council of the Hungarian People's Republic
 Vendel Bicsár (born 1947), Hungarian goldsmith and glass artist

References

External links 
 Street map (Hungarian)

Populated places in Somogy County
Hungarian German communities in Somogy County
Hungarian Croatian communities in Somogy County